Britt may refer to:

Places
 Britt, Iowa, United States
 Britt, Minnesota, United States
 Britt, Ontario, Canada
 Britt Peak, Marie Byrd Land, Antarctica
 Britt Township, Hancock County, Iowa, United States

Other uses
 Britt (actress), Swedish actress, TV producer and author
 Britt (name), a list of people and fictional characters with either the given name or surname
 Britt Airways, a commuter airline that became Continental Express carrier ExpressJet Airlines
 Britt's Department Store, an American store chain from 1962 to 1982
 Britt Festival, a performing arts festival in southern Oregon
 SS Britt, a Swedish cargo ship
 The Britt, formerly Sutton Place Hotel Toronto

See also
 Café Britt, a Costa Rican coffee roasting and chocolate manufacturing company
 
 Brit (disambiguation)